Sanjiv Kumar (born 15/01/1958 in Maniadih, District Dhanbad (Jharkhand) in India) is the politician from Jharkhand Mukti Morcha Party.

He was elected to Rajya Sabha from state of Jharkhand of the ticket of JMM in May 2012.

References

1958 births
Living people
People from Dhanbad district
Rajya Sabha members from Jharkhand
Jharkhand Mukti Morcha politicians